Sherwood Park railway station is located on the Warrnambool line in Victoria, Australia. It serves the city of Warrnambool, and it opened on 19 February 2006.

The station also serves the Warrnambool Campus of Deakin University. The station has limited usage due to its location and considerable distance from the centre of Warrnambool, lack of residential development within close proximity and limited pedestrian access, as it is situated just off the Princes Highway.

Sherwood Park was first announced during the 2002 Victorian State Election. 

The station is the least used railway station on the Warrnambool line, and one of the least used railway stations in Victoria. Recent patronage data indicates that the station served only 1,814 passengers in 2016-2017, or 4.96 a day.

Platforms and services

Sherwood Park has one platform. It is serviced by V/Line Warrnambool line services.

Platform 1:
 V/Line services to Warrnambool & Southern Cross

Transport links

Transit South West operates two routes via Sherwood Park station, under contract to Public Transport Victoria:
: Warrnambool – Deakin University Warrnambool Campus
: Warrnambool – Allansford

Gallery

References

Railway stations in Australia opened in 2006
Regional railway stations in Victoria (Australia)
Warrnambool